Middletown High School can refer to:

Middletown High School (California) in Middletown, California
Middletown High School (Connecticut) in Middletown, Connecticut
Middletown High School (Delaware) in Middletown, Delaware
Middletown High School (Maryland) in Middletown, Maryland
Middletown High School North, in Middletown Township, New Jersey
Middletown High School South, in Middletown Township, New Jersey
Middletown High School (New York) in Middletown, Orange County, New York
Middletown High School (Ohio) in Middletown, Ohio
Middletown Area High School (Pennsylvania) in Middletown, Dauphin County, Pennsylvania
Middletown High School (Rhode Island) in Middletown, Rhode Island

See also
Middleton High School (disambiguation)